St. Barnabas’ Church is a Church of England church in Lenton Abbey, Nottingham.

History
St. Barnabas’ Church was constructed at the request of the earliest residents of the newly built Lenton Abbey housing estate and was designed by the architect Thomas Cecil Howitt. At the start of construction, a box containing coins, copies of the plans and Nottingham newspapers of the day were placed under the foundation stone. It was consecrated by the Rt. Rev. Henry Mosley the Bishop of Southwell on 25 July 1938. Initially it was a chapel of ease to Holy Trinity Church, Lenton, but on 25 July 1955 it became a parish in its own right.
From 1977, the vicar of St. Mary's Church, Wollaton Park had responsibility for St. Barnabas’ parish, but now the vicar of Christ Church, Chilwell has custody of the parish.

Organ
The 2 manual pipe organ dates from 1938 and was manufactured by William Hill & Son & Norman & Beard Ltd. A specification of the organ can be found on the National Pipe Organ Register.

List of organists
Miss K. Randle 1938 – 1941
Gordon Gilbert LLCM 1941 – 1978
John Holloway 1978 – ????

References

Lenton Abbey
Churches completed in 1938
Lenton Abbey